Norberto J. Arceo (born 28 August 1943) is a former Filipino cyclist. He competed in the individual road race and team time trial events at the 1964 Summer Olympics.

References

External links
 

1943 births
Living people
Filipino male cyclists
Olympic cyclists of the Philippines
Cyclists at the 1964 Summer Olympics
Place of birth missing (living people)